Veselá is a municipality and village in Semily District in the Liberec Region of the Czech Republic. It has about 200 inhabitants.

Administrative parts
Villages and hamlets of Bítouchov, Kotelsko, Vranovsko and Žďár are administrative parts of Veselá.

References

Villages in Semily District